Mark N. Willis (born August 1, 1959) is an American politician. He is a member of the South Carolina House of Representatives from the 16th District, serving since 2008. He is a member of the Republican party.

Willis is Chair of the House Interstate Cooperation Committee.

In 2023, Willis was briefly among the Republican co-sponsors of the South Carolina Prenatal Equal Protection Act of 2023, which would make women who had abortions eligible for the death penalty; he later withdrew his sponsorship.

References

Living people
1963 births
Republican Party members of the South Carolina House of Representatives
21st-century American politicians